Seven and the Sun was an American rock band consisting of Seven (lead vocals), Wally Brandt (guitar), Bill Brandt (programming), and Eddie Zak (guitars). They are best known for their 2002 single "Walk with Me". Their song was used in the TV soap opera Passions, and was also featured in the Columbia Pictures film, America's Sweethearts starring Julia Roberts, Billy Crystal, John Cusack and Catherine Zeta-Jones. It received moderate air play on American radio, reaching number 38 on the Billboard Adult Top 40, number 27 on the Billboard Mainstream Top 40 and number 40 on the Billboard Top 40 Tracks chart. "Walk with Me" was their only hit.

In September, 2003, their song "Back to the Innocence" was chosen to be the theme song for The John Walsh Show on NBC.

After they broke up in 2002, Seven and Wally Brandt both formed the country band Whiskey Falls.

Discography
Album
Back to the Innocence - released by Atlantic Records on June 18, 2002
Singles
"Walk with Me" (2002)

References

External links
Interview with Seven And The Sun
Interview: IN THE SUMMERTIME WITH SEVEN AND THE SUN

American pop rock music groups